Confucian ritual religion (s 礼教, t 禮教 Lǐjiào, "rites' transmission", also called 名教 Míngjiào, the "names' transmission"), or the Confucian civil religion, defines the civil religion of China. It consists of the state-endorsed ceremonies and sacrifices (cults), held according to Confucian modalities, dedicated to the Gods which represent the theologico-political origin of the state itself and the Chinese civilisation. These rituals have undergone a great revitalisation in post-Maoist China, creating a public space in which the Chinese state and popular Confucian movements jostle and negotiate with each other.

Worship of cosmological gods and of Confucius, is carried out regularly at consecrated public spaces.

See also
 American civil religion
 Chinese folk religion
 Confucianism
 Shendao
 Confucian Academy
 Supreme Council for the Confucian Religion in Indonesia
 Holy Confucian Church
 Religion in China
 State religion & Civil religion
 Religious Confucianism

References

Citations

Sources
 
 
 

Chinese folk religion
Religious Confucianism
Confucian rites